Hemicoelus canaliculatus is a species of death-watch beetle in the family Ptinidae.

References

Further reading

 
 
 
 
 

Anobiinae
Beetles described in 1863